Gornal Halt was a small railway stop on the Wombourne Branch Line. It was opened by the Great Western Railway in 1925 and closed in 1932. The halt served the nearby village of Gornal Wood. The railway passing through the site remained open until 1968.

The South Staffordshire Railway Walk ends around the Gornal Halt area and the site of Gornal Halt towards Pensnett Halt railway station has become "Himley View", which is a mix of a housing estate and industrial estates.

References

Further reading

Disused railway stations in Dudley
Former Great Western Railway stations
Railway stations in Great Britain opened in 1925
Railway stations in Great Britain closed in 1932